The 1995 Moscow Victory Day Parades were two military parades held on 9 May 1995 to commemorate the historic 50th anniversary golden jubilee of the capitulation of Nazi Germany to the Soviet Union in 1945. The parades marked the Soviet Union's victory in the Great Patriotic War. These were the first post-Soviet military parades held in Russia the first one being in held for veterans on Red Square at 8:00 in the morning followed by another parade of infantry and military equipment at Poklonnaya Hill at 3:00 in the afternoon.

Poklonnaya Hill Parade
The Poklonnaya Parade was the first parade in the post-Soviet era and the only one in the Yeltsin era to feature military hardware, which would not be displayed again until 2008.

The parade was observed by Russian leaders and foreign dignitaries from a provisional facade. Major political figures attending were President of the Russian Federation Boris Yeltsin, First Lady Naina Yeltsina, and Prime Minister Viktor Chernomyrdin. The parade was inspected by Minister of Defence General of the Army Pavel Grachev, who later made the keynote address (the last time that the Minister of Defense made such an address on a national parade) and commanded by Moscow Military District Commander Colonel General Leonid Kuznetsov. It was on that very parade where Russian soldiers paraded with new post-Soviet military uniforms. It was the first time since 1957 that aviation took part in the parade.

Among the new additions that debuted were the BMP-3, BMD-3, S-300 missile system, BM-30 Smerch and the 2S19 Msta SPG.

Full order of the parade in the Poklonnaya Hill complex 
 General of the Army Pavel Grachev (parade reviewing inspector)
 Colonel General Leonid Kuznetsov (parade commander)

Military bands 
 Massed Military Bands of the Moscow Military District

Ground column 
 Corps of Drums of the Moscow Military Music College
 Victory Banner Color Guard
 Front Standards
 Colour guard battalion of regimental, brigade and division colors of the Soviet Army
 1st Honor Guard Company, Independent Commandant's Regiment
 Historical regiment
 M. V. Frunze Military Academy
 Military University of the Ministry of Defense of Russia
 Peter the Great Military Academy of the Strategic Missile Forces
 Military Armored Forces Academy Marshal Rodion Malinovsky 
 Military Engineering Academy
 Military Academy of Chemical Defense and Control
 Yuri Gagarin Air Force Academy
 Prof. Nikolai Zhukovsky Air Force Engineering Academy
 St. Petersburg Naval Institute
 Ryazan Guards Higher Airborne Command School (first appearance)
 98th Guards Airborne Division
 Moscow Border Guards Institute of the Federal Border Guard Service "Moscow City Council"
 366th Guards Naval Infantry Brigade of the Baltic Fleet
 OMSDON Ind. Motorized Division of the Internal Troops of the Ministry of Internal Affairs of Russia "Felix Dzerzhinsky"
 Suvorov Military School
 Nakhimov Naval School
 Moscow Military High Command Training School "Supreme Soviet of Russia"

Red Square Parade
The Red Square Parade was the another parade held in post-Soviet and in the Yeltsin era but did not feature military hardware, which would not be displayed again until 2008. This parade would feature all surviving veterans from all fronts marching past Red Square.
The parade was observed by Russian leaders from Lenin's Mausoleum and more than 50 world leaders, most notably United Nations Secretary General Boutros Boutros-Ghali, President Jacques Santer, United States President Bill Clinton, Canadian Prime Minister Jean Chretien, British Prime Minister John Major, Chinese President Jiang Zemin, Azerbaijani President Heydar Aliyev and Uzbek President Islam Karimov.  Major political figures attending were President of the Russian Federation Boris Yeltsin and Prime Minister Viktor Chernomyrdin. The parade was inspected by retired Marshal of the Soviet Union Viktor Kulikov and commanded by retired General of the Army Vladimir Govorov. In this parade, Russian President Boris Yeltsin delivered his first Victory Day address. This parade was also the only to feature and show the Iberian Gate and Chapel under construction on Red Square, which was later finished the following year. Among the notable veteran participants was pilot Stepan Borozenets.

Full order of the parade on Red Square 
 Marshal Viktor Kulikov (parade reviewing inspector)
 General of the Army Vladimir Govorov (parade commander)

Military bands 
 Massed Military Bands of the Moscow Military District

Ground column 
 Victory Banner Color Guard
 Corps of Drums of the Moscow Military Music College
 Colour guard battalion of regimental, brigade and division colors of the Red Army
 Historical regiment
 Veterans contingents
 Karelian Front
 Leningrad Front
 1st Baltic Front
 1st Belorussian Front
 2nd Belorussian Front
 3rd Belorussian Front
 1st Ukrainian Front
 2nd Ukrainian Front
 3rd Ukrainian Front
 4th Ukrainian Front
 Suvorov Military School
 Nakhimov Naval School
 M. V. Frunze Military Academy
 Military University of the Ministry of Defense of Russia
 Peter the Great Military Academy of the Strategic Missile Forces
 Military Armored Forces Academy Marshal Rodion Malinovsky
 336th Guards Naval Infantry Brigade
 OMSDON Ind. Motorized Division of the Internal Troops of the Ministry of Internal Affairs of Russia "Felix Dzerzhinsky"
 Russian Airborne Forces
 Moscow Border Guards Institute of the Federal Border Guard Service "Moscow City Council"
 Moscow Military High Command Training School "Supreme Soviet of Russia"

Dignitaries in Attendance 
In March 1995, White House Press Secretary Mike McCurry announced a state visit by President Bill Clinton to Russia on 9 and 10 May to attend the celebrations as well as another visit to Ukraine on 11 May. One of the largest gathering of world leaders in Russian history, the 1995 parade was attended by a total of 56 foreign heads of state and government, along with 6 multilateral leaders.

  Boutros Boutros-Ghali, the Secretary General of the United Nations
  Javier Solana, the Secretary General of NATO
  Ivan Korotchenya, the Secretary General of CIS
  Cornelio Sommaruga, the President of the International Committee of the Red Cross
  Federico Mayor Zaragoza, the Director General of UNESCO
  Jacques Santer, the President of the European Commission
  Tomiichi Murayama, the Prime Minister of Japan
  Yitzhak Rabin, the Prime Minister of Israel
  Jean Chretien, the Prime Minister of Canada
  Hosni Mubarak, the President of Egypt
  Bill Clinton, the President of the United States of America and First Lady Hillary Clinton
  Jiang Zemin, the President of the People's Republic of China
  John Major, the Prime Minister of the United Kingdom
  François Mitterrand, the President of France
  Marc Forne Molne, the Prime Minister of Andorra
  Helmut Kohl, the Federal Chancellor of Germany
  Manfred Gerlach, the former President of East Germany
  Jean-Claude Juncker, the Prime Minister of Luxembourg
  Poul Nyrup Rasmussen, the Prime Minister of Denmark
  Gro Harlem Brundtland, the Prime Minister of Norway
  Jozsef Antall, the Prime Minister of Hungary
  Felipe Gonzalez, the Prime Minister of Spain
  Mario Soares, the President of Portugal
  Ingvar Carlsson, the Prime Minister of Sweden
  Vigdis Finnbogadottir, the President of Iceland
  Mary Robinson, the President of Ireland
  Massimo D’Alema, the Prime Minister of Italy
  Wim Kok, the Prime Minister of the Netherlands
  Thomas Klestil, the President of Austria
  Pascal Couchepin, the Chancellor of Switzerland
  Zhelyu Zhelev, the President of Bulgaria
  Edward Fenech Adami, the Prime Minister of Malta
  Glafcos Klerides, the President of Cyprus
  Ion Iliescu, the President of Romania
  Punsalmaagiin Ochirbat, the President of Mongolia
  Konstantinos Stephanopoulos, the President of Greece
  Martti Ahtisaari, the President of Finland
  Jean-Luc Dehaene, the Prime Minister of Belgium
  Tansu Çiller, the Prime Minister of Turkey
  Rainier III, the Sovereign Prince of Monaco
  Michael Ritter, the Deputy Prime Minister of Liechtenstein
  Zoran Lilic, the President of Yugoslavia
  Franjo Tudman, the President of Croatia
  Kiro Gligorov, the President of Macedonia
  Alija Izetbegovic, the President of Bosnia and Herzegovina
  Radovan Karadzic, the President of Republika Srpska
  Milan Kucan, the President of Slovenia
  Michal Kovac, the President of Slovakia
  Vaclav Havel, the President of the Czech Republic
  Alexander Kwasniewski, Leader of the Social Democracy of the Republic of Poland
  Leonid Kuchma, the President of Ukraine
  Heydar Aliyev, the President of Azerbaijan
  Levon Ter-Petrosyan, the President of Armenia
  Sali Berisha, the President of Albania
  Eduard Shevardnadze, the President of Georgia
  Nursultan Nazarbayev, the President of Kazakhstan
  Askar Akayev, the President of Kyrgyzstan
  Mircea Snegur, the President of Moldova
  Saparmurat Niyazov, the President of Turkmenistan
  Emomali Rahmon, the President of Tajikistan
  Islam Karimov, the President of Uzbekistan
  Rafic Hariri, the Prime Minister of Lebanon
  Lee Hong-koo, the Prime Minister of South Korea
  Pranab Mukherjee, the Deputy Prime Minister of India
  Lê Đức Anh, the President of Vietnam
  John Howard, the Leader of the Opposition of Australia
  Don McKinnon, the Foreign Minister of New Zealand

Also present were plenty of Foreign Diplomats and representatives of all Second World War veterans from the European and Mediterranean Theaters of Operations.

Music

Music for Red Square parade 
 Review and Address
 Jubilee Slow March "25 Years of the Red Army" (Юбилейный встречный марш "25 лет РККА) by Semeon Tchernetsky
 Slow March of the Officers Schools (Встречный Марш офицерских училищ) by Semyon Tchernetsky)
 March of the Preobrazhensky Regiment (Марш Преображенского Полка)
 Slow March of the Guards of the Navy (Гвардейский Встречный Марш Военно-Морского Флота) by Nikolai Pavlocich Ivanov-Radkevich
 Glory (Славься) by Mikhail Glinka
 Parade Fanfare May 9 (Парадная Фанфара “9 Мая”) by Nikolai Camokhvalov
 State Anthem of the Russian Federation (Patriotic Song) – Государственный Гимн Российской Федерации (Патриотическая Песня) by Mikhail Glinka
 Fanfare

 Veteran and Infantry Column
 We are the Army of the People (Мы Армия Народа) by Georgy Viktorovich Mavsesyan
 Sacred War (Священная война) by Alexander Alexanderov
 Farewell of Slavianka (Прощание Славянки) by Vasiliy Agapkin
 March Victory (Марш “Победа”) by Albert Mikhailovich Arutyunov
 March from the theme of the song On an Unknown Hill (Марш на темы песни “На безымянной высоте”)
 In the Dugout (В землянке) by Alexei Surkov
 We Need One Victory (Нам Нужна Одна Победа) by Bulat Shalvovich Okudzhava
 In Defense of the Homeland (В защиту Родины) by Viktor Sergeyevich Runov
 On Guard for the Peace (На страже Мира) by Boris Alexanderovich Diev
 Combat March (Строевой Марш) by Dmitry Illarionovich Pertsev
 On the Road (В Путь) by Vasily Pavlovich Solovyov-Sedoy

 Conclusion
 Bow to those Great Years (Поклонимся Великим Тем Годам) by Iosif Kobzon
 1812 Overture Finale (Soviet version) by Tchaikovsky
 Victory Day (День Победы) by David Fyodorovich Tukhmanov

Music for Poklonnaya Hill parade 
 Review and Address
 Jubilee Slow March "25 Years of the Red Army" (Юбилейный встречный марш "25 лет РККА) by Semeon Tchernetsky
 Slow March of the Officers Schools (Встречный Марш офицерских училищ) by Semyon Tchernetsky
 Slow March of the Tankmen (Встречный Марш Танкистов) by Semyon Tchernetsky
 Slow March of the Guards of the Navy (Гвардейский Встречный Марш Военно-Морского Флота) by Nikolai Pavlocich Ivanov-Radkevich
 March of the Preobrazhensky Regiment (Марш Преображенского Полка) by Unknown
 Slow March of the Officers Schools (Встречный Марш офицерских училищ) by Semyon Tchernetsky
 Slow March of the Guards of the Navy (Гвардейский Встречный Марш Военно-Морского Флота) by Nikolai Pavlocich Ivanov-Radkevich
 Slow March (Встречный Марш) by Dmitry Pertsev
 Slow March of the Red Army (Встречный Марш Красной Армии) by Semyon Tchernetsky
 Glory (Славься) by Mikhail Glinka
 Parade Fanfare May 9 (Парадная Фанфара “9 Мая”) by Nikolai Camokhvalov
 State Anthem of the Russian Federation (Patriotic Song) – Государственный Гимн Российской Федерации (Патриотическая Песня) by Mikhail Glinka
 Fanfare

 Infantry Column
 Victory Day (День Победы) by David Fyodorovich Tukhmanov
 Farewell of Slavianka (Прощание Славянки) by Vasiliy Agapkin
 In Defense of the Homeland (В защиту Родины) by Viktor Sergeyevich Runov
 On Guard for the Peace (На страже Мира) by Boris Alexanderovich Diev
 Combat March (Строевой Марш) by Dmitry Illarionovich Pertsev
 Air March (Авиамарш) by Yuliy Abramovich Khait
 Leningrad (Ленинград) by Viktor Sergeyeich Runov
 We are the Army of the People (Мы Армия Народа) by Georgy Viktorovich Mavsesyan
 Sports March (Спортивный Марш) by Valentin Volkov
 On the Road (В Путь) by Vasily Pavlovich Solovyov-Sedoy

 Air Column
 Air March (Авиамарш) by Yuliy Abramovich Khait
 Legendary Sevastopol (Легендарный Севастополь) by Bano Muradeli

 Vehicle Column
 Victorious March (Победный Марш) by Nikolai Pavlocich Ivanov-Radkevich
 Salute to Moscow (Салют Москвы) by Semyon Tchernetsky
 My Dear Capital/My Moscow (Дорогая Моя Столица/Моя Москва) by Isaac Dunayevsky

References

External links 
Watch parade scenes here:
 
 
 The Russian evening newscast featuring the celebrations of the 50th anniversary of V-E Day in Russia on C-SPAN

Moscow Victory Day Parades
1995 in Russia
1995 in military history
May 1995 events in Russia